Cecil Irwin may refer to:

 Cecil Irwin (musician) (1902–1935), American jazz reed player and arranger
 Cecil Irwin (footballer) (born 1942), English footballer